Dobie is an unincorporated community located in the town of Hawthorne, Douglas County, Wisconsin, United States. It is near Lake Nebagamon.

Notes

Unincorporated communities in Douglas County, Wisconsin
Unincorporated communities in Wisconsin